Sultan Iskandar Shah Ibni Almarhum Sultan Idris Murshidul Azzam Shah Rahmatullah  (10 May 1881 – 14 August 1938) was the 30th Sultan of Perak. Perak at that time was part of the British-administered Federated Malay States. He stayed at the Istana Kenangan, then moved to the Istana Iskandariah in Bukit Chandan, Kuala Kangsar.

Early life

Born at Kuala Keboi, Kampar, 10 May 1876, he was the third son of Sultan Idris Murshidul Azzam Shah and his wife Cik Ngah Manah binti Manda Duwayat, herself a member of the Royal House of Perak.

Sultan of Perak
He was made Raja Bendahara in 1918 during the reign of his elder half- brother, Sultan Abdul Jalil Nasiruddin Muhtaram Shah. He ascended the throne in November 1918 following the death of his brother. It was during his reign that the Dinding and Pulau Pangkor territories were returned by the British in 1935. Prior to that, both territories were administered as part of the Straits Settlements.

Sultan Iskandar was a major advocate of decentralization in the Federated Malay States and even visited the Colonial Office in August 1924 to espouse his views.

For a short time, he resided at Istana Lembah (which was built by Tukang Sofian after the great flood of 1926 and completed in 1931) whilst the Istana Iskandariah was being built and later be completed in 1933.

After a short illness, He died at Istana Iskandariah on 14 August 1938. He was interred at the Al-Ghufran Royal Mausoleum at Bukit Chandan with the posthumous title Marhum Kaddasullah. He was succeeded by his brother-in-law, Abdul Aziz al-Muʽtasim Billah Shah.

Legacy
After a short illness, Almarhum Sultan Iskandar Shah death at Istana Iskandariah on 14 August 1938. Almarhum was interred at the Al-Ghufran Royal Mausoleum at Bukit Chandan and the posthumous title Marhum Kadasallah was conferred

References

19th-century births
1938 deaths
Sultans of Perak
Knights Grand Cross of the Order of St Michael and St George
Knights Commander of the Royal Victorian Order